The Courts Act 1971 is an Act of the Parliament of the United Kingdom, the purpose of which was to reform and modernise the courts system of England and Wales.

It established the Crown Court, introduced the posts of circuit judge and recorder, and abolished various local courts across the country. Many of its provisions have since been repealed by the Senior Courts Act 1981, but the essential structure described in the Act is still in place.

The first part of the Act concerns the new Crown Court. It is established as part of the Supreme Court of Judicature, replacing courts of assize and quarter sessions. The appellate jurisdiction of these courts is transferred, and the new court given exclusive jurisdiction in "trial on indictment". It is described as a "superior court of record" for England and Wales. This section has now been superseded by the Senior Courts Act 1981.

History

Report of the Royal Commission on Assizes and Quarter Sessions (Sessional Papers, House of Commons, Cmnd 4153, 1966–69, XXVIII, 433) was published in 1969 and chaired by Dr. Beeching. The Act was based on most of the report recommendations.

The courts abolished by this Act are:
 all assize courts
 all quarter sessions
 The Court of Chancery of the County Palatine of Lancaster (merged with the High Court)
 The Court of Chancery of the County Palatine of Durham and Sadberge (merged with the High Court)
 The Mayor's and City of London Court (a new county court is established with the same name)
 The Tolzey and Pie Poudre Courts of the City and County of Bristol
 The Liverpool Court of Passage
 The Norwich Guildhall Court
 The Court of Record for the Hundred of Salford
The officers of these courts were generally eligible to become circuit judges.

The post of circuit judge is introduced in the second part of the Act. They sit in the Crown Court and county courts, are appointed by the monarch on the Lord Chancellor's advice, and retire at the age of 72 (this has now been changed to 70 by the Judicial Pensions and Retirement Act 1993). The Lord Chancellor may also sack a circuit judge on the grounds of "incapacity or misbehaviour". Judges are to have a salary and pension, and must take an oath of office. The act also introduces part-time Crown Court judges, known as recorders, who are similarly appointed by the Lord Chancellor.

The fourth part of the Courts Act governs the selection of juries and related rules; it has since been repealed by the Juries Act 1974. Most of the remainder of the Act is about other miscellaneous administrative provisions relating to appointments, payment, and accommodation; these have almost all been repealed by the Supreme Court Act and other justice legislation.

References
Halsbury's Statutes,
Civil Procedure (The White Book), Sweet & Maxwell, 2006, Volume 2, 9B-83 - 9B-93

United Kingdom Acts of Parliament 1971
Acts of the Parliament of the United Kingdom concerning England and Wales